Bridgham and Brettenham Heaths is a  biological Site of Special Scientific Interest north-east of Thetford in Norfolk, England. It is a Nature Conservation Review site, Grade I, and part of the Breckland Special Area of Conservation and Special Protection Area. Brettenham Heath is a National Nature Reserve.

The dominant plants on this dry acidic heath are heather and wavy hair-grass. There are also areas of scrub and woodland. The site supports many species of breeding birds, including common curlews and nightjars.

The site is in two separate areas, which are open to the public.

References

Sites of Special Scientific Interest in Norfolk
Special Protection Areas in England
Special Areas of Conservation in England
National nature reserves in England
Nature Conservation Review sites